Arena is a 2009 Portuguese short drama film directed by João Salaviza. It won the Short Film Palme d'Or at the 2009 Cannes Film Festival.

Cast
 Carloto Cotta as Mauro
 Cláudio Rosa as 2nd kid
 Rafael Sardo as 1st kid
 Rodrigo Madeira as Alemão

See also
 Portuguese films of the 2000s

References

External links

2009 films
2000s Portuguese-language films
2009 drama films
2009 short films
Portuguese short films
Films directed by João Salaviza
Short Film Palme d'Or winners